Franz Schick (born 22 June 1960) is a retired German football forward. Schick, while only making a very limited impact on professional football, playing four times for VfL Bochum in the Fußball-Bundesliga, had his greatest success with third division side TSV Ampfing, where he became the top scorer of the Fußball-Bayernliga on five occasions.

Biography
Schick, while playing for the TSV Ampfing in the third-division Fußball-Bayernliga, became the league's most successful goal scorer. He took out the honours of the league's top scorer on five occasions, 1980-81 (30), 1981–82 (29), 1984–85 (34), 1985–86 (34) and 1987–88 (29), all while with Ampfing. All up, he scored 217 goals in the league. Ampfing had gained promotion to the Bayernliga in 1979 and was relegated again in 1989, never to return.

He left Ampfing during the 1982-83 season to join TSV 1860 Munich; but was not quite as successful at his new club, scoring only 20 goals that season, and he returned to his old club during the following season. Schick spend a short stint with Fußball-Bundesliga side VfL Bochum in the 1986-87 season but made only four appearances for th club and promptly returned to Ampfing.

In 1980-81, 1985-86 and 1987–88, Schick was the best goalscorer in all of the German Amateur-Oberligas.

After his player career, Schick turned to coaching, coaching amateur sides SV Nußdorf and SC Baldham, before joining Bayernliga side Falke Markt Schwaben in January 2003.

Honours
 Bayernliga top scorer
 Winner: 1980-81, 1981–82, 1984–85, 1985–86, 1987–88

Career statistics

References

External links
 

1960 births
Living people
German footballers
Bundesliga players
TSV 1860 Munich players
VfL Bochum players
Association football forwards